The Secondhand Radio (고물라디오) is the 4th official studio album of South Korean Rock Band Crying Nut. Despite their four member's military service period right after releasing this album, Quick Service man, Deathblow Offside got hits and their classic songs were still loved by the public.
Deathblow Offside 's original song was recorded as the 2002 FIFA World Cup Cheer for South Korea Which included Real Madrid's cheer's melody, but Deathblow Offside was arranged to include only Crying Nut's original writing.

Track listing

Personnel 
 Park, Yoon-Sick  – vocal, guitar
 Lee, Sang-Myun  – guitar, voice 
 Han, kyung-Rock  – bass, voice
 Lee, Sang-Hyuk  – drums, voice
 Kim, In-Soo  –  Accordion, Organ

References

External links

2002 albums
Korean-language albums